The Spanish Sword is a low budget 1962 British adventure film directed by Ernest Morris and starring Ronald Howard, June Thorburn and Nigel Green.

Premise
Rebellion breaks out during the reign of Henry III, and a brave knight foils the plans of a baron to steal the treasure of the King.

Cast
 Ronald Howard - Sir Richard Clovell
 June Thorburn - Lady Eleanor
 Nigel Green - Baron Breaute
 Trader Faulkner - Philip
 Derrick Sherwin - Edmund
 Robin Hunter - Thomas of Exeter
 Sheila Whittingham - Frances
 Barry Shawzin - Redbeard
 Garard Green - Sergeant

Critical reception
TV Guide wrote, "a weak script is saved by some impressive battle scenes and authentic-looking costuming."

References

External links

1962 films
British historical adventure films
1960s historical adventure films
Films directed by Ernest Morris
Films set in the 13th century
Films shot at New Elstree Studios
1960s English-language films
1960s British films